The Muzaffarpur–Gorakhpur line via Narkatiaganj and Sagauli is a railway line connecting Muzaffarpur in the Indian state of Bihar to Gorakhpur in Uttar Pradesh. The  line passes through the plains of North Bihar and the Gangetic Plain of Bihar and Uttar Pradesh.

Speed limit

The "Muzaffarpur–Gorakhpur line via Narkatiaganj"  route is not an A-Class line of Indian Railways. So maximum speed is restricted to 110 km/hr as there is single BG electrified line between Muzaffarpur Junction and Gorakhpur Junction.

Stations

Future
The foundation stone of doubling of railway line and electrification was laid by the hon'ble Prime Minister Modi on his trip to Motihari on the centenary celebration of the Champaran Satyagrah in 2018.
Modi flags off train, kick-starts track doubling, dedicates loco unit to nation in Bihar.
The doubling work survey for Muzaffarpur–Gorakhpur main line was sanctioned in the Railway Budget of 2012–13.

The East Central Railway zone also applied for the electrification of the following sections to the Ministry of Railways (India) for the Rail Budget 2015–16.
 Darbhanga–Samastipur 
 Samastipur–Raxaul 
 Valmikinagar–Muzaffarpur  
 Mansi (Khagaria)–Katihar

Sidings and workshops

 Kanti Thermal Power Station, Muzaffarpur
 Bharat Wagon Engineering Limited, Muzaffarpur
 Major Freight Terminal at Narayanpur Anant
 IOC Indian oil Petroleum Siding
 Bharat Petroleum Siding, Narayanpur Anant
 FCI Siding at Narayanpur Anant

See also
 Barauni–Samastipur–Muzaffarpur–Hajipur line
 Muzaffarpur–Gorakhpur line (via Hajipur, Raxaul and Sitamarhi)
 Barauni–Gorakhpur, Raxaul and Jainagar lines
 Muzaffarpur–Hajipur section
 Barauni–Samastipur section
 
 
 East Central Railway zone

References

|

Modi flags off train, kick-starts track doubling, dedicates loco unit to nation in Bihar

5 ft 6 in gauge railways in India
Railway lines in Bihar

Railway lines in Uttar Pradesh